Ken Joyce (born October 28, 1964 in Portland, Maine) is an American born baseball coach and manager.

Biography 
Joyce was born in Portland, Maine and was a member of the 1983 Deering High School Class A State Champion baseball team before attending the University of Southern Maine. A four-year starter as an infielder, he set an NAIA record with seven hits in a NAIA Regional tournament before participating in the 1985 NAIA College World Series. He finished his playing career and became the assistant baseball coach at the University of Southern Maine and coached in the NCAA Division III World Series. Joyce became a middle school physical education teacher before joining the Portland Sea Dogs as a volunteer bullpen coach in 1994. The volunteer stint turned into his first  professional coaching contract when he was named hitting coach of the Florida Marlins AA Sea Dogs affiliate in the Eastern League.

Joyce became the hitting coach for the Utica Blue Sox of the New York-Penn League in 1997 earning the first of his World Series rings as part of the Florida Marlins organization. The Marlins promoted Joyce to manager of the Blue Sox, a position he held in 1998 and 1999. He became the interim head baseball coach at New England College in the spring of 2000. In 2000 and 2001 Joyce coached and managed in Independent Professional Baseball for the Northern League East Catskill Cougars and the Adirondack Lumberjacks.

The Toronto Blue Jays hired Joyce as the hitting coach for the Medicine Hat Blue Jays in 2002. He was promoted to the Blue Jays AA New Haven Ravens in the Eastern League. New Haven led the Eastern League with a .293 average, which topped the 10-year franchise’s record by 11 percentage points. In 2004 Joyce managed the Blue Jays A affiliate Charleston Alley Cats in the South Atlantic League to an 84-56 record. The Blue Jays relocated the Class A affiliate to Michigan where Joyce managed the Lansing Lugnuts of the Midwest League in 2005 and 2006. He returned to the Eastern League in 2007 and 2008 as the hitting coach for the New Hampshire Fisher Cats.  In 2009 Joyce became the hitting coach for the Blue Jays AAA Las Vegas 51's of the Pacific Coast League leading them to a .290 team batting average.

Joyce joined the San Francisco Giants in 2010 as hitting coach for the AAA Fresno Grizzlies of the Pacific Coast League earning his first of three World Series rings with the Giants. He then returned to the Eastern League as the hitting coach for the AA Richmond Flying Squirrels from 2011 to 2016 and was selected as the hitting coach for the Scottsdale Scorpions of the 2011 Arizona Fall League where he worked with Mike Trout and Bryce Harper who became 2012 NL and AL Rookies of the Year. In 2016 he stepped way from professional baseball to spend time with his family.

In 2017 the New York Yankees hired Joyce as the hitting coach for the Class A Charleston RiverDogs of the South Atlantic League. He spent half the season with Charleston and half the season with the Gulf Coast League Yankees West. Joyce returned to the New York-Penn League as the hitting coach for the Staten Island Yankees in 2018 and 2019. He was selected to as the hitting coach for the Surprise Saguaros of the Arizona Fall League in 2019 before returning to the Eastern League with the AA Trenton Thunder in the pandemic-shortened 2020 season.

Joyce was inducted into the University of Southern Maine Husky Hall of Fame in 1998. He was also inducted into the state of Maine Baseball Hall of Fame in 2001.

References 

Minor league baseball managers
1964 births
Living people
Sportspeople from Portland, Maine
Deering High School alumni
Southern Maine Huskies baseball players
Baseball coaches from Maine